Wildensee is the name of:

 Wildensee (Eschau), a village in the market borough of Eschau, county of Miltenberg, Bavaria, Germany
 Wildensee (Mittenwald), a village in the market borough of Mittenwald, county of Garmisch-Partenkirchen, Bavaria, Germany
 Wildensee (Zeitz), a village in the borough of Zeitz, Burgenland county, Saxony-Anhalt
 Wildensee (Salzkammergut), a lake in the Totes Gebirge in the Austrian state of Styria
 a small Alpine lake at 2,514 metres in the Venediger Group of the High Tauern in the Austrian state of Tyrol, East Tyrol. Also called the Wilden See.
Wildlense is the name of a non profit organization working for wildlife & nature conservation with name Wildlense Eco Foundation.

See also 
 Wildsee (disambiguation)